Abelvær is a fishing village in Nærøysund municipality in Trøndelag county, Norway. The village is located on the small island of Store Kalvøy at the mouth of the Foldafjord. The village areas of Ramsta and Steine lie just to the northeast of Abelvær. There is a road connection to the mainland from Abelvær.

Media gallery

References

Villages in Trøndelag
Nærøysund
Nærøy